Christopher Edmond Hunter (born July 7, 1984) is a former American professional basketball player and currently works as the Director of Operations for the University of Michigan men's basketball team, where he also played college basketball. Before joining the Michigan Wolverines men's basketball staff, he played in several professional leagues. Most notably, he played in 60 games for the Golden State Warriors of the NBA, was an NBA Development League All-star in 2009 and played abroad.

Pro career

In 2006, he signed with Herens Basket of Switzerland before being released before the start of the season. He then signed with AZS Koszalin of Poland.

In 2007, he signed with Spotter Leuven of Belgium. He was later released in December 2007 due to injury.

In November 2008, he was acquired by the Fort Wayne Mad Ants. He was an NBA DLeague All-Star in 2009. On April 14, 2009, he signed with the New York Knicks. On October 22, 2009, he was waived before appearing in a regular season game. On November 1, 2009, he was re-acquired by the Mad Ants. On November 20, 2009, Hunter signed with the Golden State Warriors, making him the first call-up of the 2009–10 NBA D-League season.

He joined the New York Knicks for the 2010 NBA Summer League. On October 30, 2010, he was re-acquired by the Mad Ants. On December 28, 2010, Hunter was waived by the Mad Ants due to injury.

In November 2011, he was again re-acquired by the Mad Ants. On December 12, 2011, he signed with the New York Knicks. However, he was waived on December 22. He then returned to the Mad Ants. In January 2012, he was again waived due to injury.

He joined the Los Angeles Clippers for the 2012 NBA Summer League.

In November 2013, he was re-acquired by the Fort Wayne Mad Ants. On December 23, 2013, he was waived by the Mad Ants.

He served University of Michigan Men's Basketball as a Director of Player Personnel. On August 4, 2017, Michigan promoted Hunter from director of player personnel to director of basketball operations.

He is married with 3 children.

References

External links

1984 births
Living people
African-American basketball players
American expatriate basketball people in Belgium
American expatriate basketball people in Poland
American men's basketball players
Basketball players from Gary, Indiana
Centers (basketball)
Fort Wayne Mad Ants players
Golden State Warriors players
Michigan Wolverines men's basketball players
Power forwards (basketball)
Undrafted National Basketball Association players
21st-century African-American sportspeople
20th-century African-American people